The 2021–22 season was the 97th season in the existence of BSC Young Boys and the club's 26th consecutive season in the top flight of Swiss football. In addition to the domestic league, Young Boys participated in this season's editions of the Swiss Cup and the UEFA Champions League.

Players

First-team squad

Out on loan

Transfers

Pre-season and friendlies

Competitions

Overall record

Swiss Super League

League table

Results summary

Results by round

Matches
The league fixtures were announced on 24 June 2021.

Swiss Cup

UEFA Champions League

Second qualifying round
The draw for the second qualifying round was held on 16 June 2021.

Third qualifying round
The draw for the third qualifying round was held on 19 July 2021.

Play-off round
The draw for the play-off round was held on 2 August 2021.

Group stage

The draw for the group stage was held on 26 August 2021.

Statistics

Appearances and goals

|-
! colspan=14 style=background:#DCDCDC; text-align:center| Goalkeepers

|-
! colspan=14 style=background:#DCDCDC; text-align:center| Defenders

|-
! colspan=14 style=background:#DCDCDC; text-align:center| Midfielders

|-
! colspan=14 style=background:#DCDCDC; text-align:center| Forwards

|-
! colspan=14 style=background:#DCDCDC; text-align:center| Players transferred out during the season-->

Goalscorers

References

BSC Young Boys seasons
Young Boys
2021–22 UEFA Champions League participants seasons